In Japanese language, Ryakuji ( "abbreviated characters", or  hissha ryakuji, meaning "handwritten abbreviated characters") are colloquial simplifications of kanji.

Status 
Ryakuji are not covered in the Kanji Kentei, nor are they officially recognized (most ryakuji are not present in Unicode). However, some abbreviated forms of hyōgaiji (characters not included in the tōyō or jōyō kanji lists) included in the JIS standards which conform to the shinjitai simplifications are included in Level pre-1 and above of the Kanji Kentei (e.g., →, →), as well as some other allowances for alternate ways of writing radicals and alternate forms. Some ryakuji were adopted as shinjitai.

Some simplifications are commonly used as special Japanese typographic symbols. These include:

Replacements of complex characters by simpler standard characters (whether related or not) is instead a different phenomenon, kakikae.

Compare this to simplified Chinese.

Use 
Ryakuji are primarily used in individual memos, notes and other such forms of handwriting. Their use has declined in recent years, possibly due to the emergence of computer technology and advanced input methods that allow equally fast input of both simple and complex characters.

Abbreviations for multiple-character words or phrases 
In all cases discussed in the other sections of this article, individual characters are simplified, but separate characters are not merged.

Examples

Notes 
Other characters are less commonly seen in public, instead being primarily found in private writing.

1 and 2. (– These are perhaps the most commonly used Ryakuji. 1 (dai, ordinal prefix) is present in Unicode as U+3427, but is not supported by the MS Gothic or Mincho family of typefaces, or Arial Unicode MS. According to the original Japanese article, 1 has been seen on roadsigns on the Keihin #3 Road (Dai-San Keihin Dōro). 2 is present in Unicode as U+95E8; it is unified with the closely related Simplified Chinese abbreviation  (both originated from cursive script forms). The Japanese form may be explicitly induced with the sequence U+95E8 U+E0100.
3. – An abbreviation of the bottom four dots in the character  is present in Unicode as  U+594C, but is not supported by the MS Gothic or MS Mincho typefaces. It does appear in Arial Unicode, Sim Sun, Sim Hei, MingLiU, KaiU and New Gulim typefaces.
4.
5. Common abbreviation in stores for days of week.
6. – Grass script form (1 and 2 also originated from grass script forms)
7. (present in Unicode as  U+3430) – Abbreviated by removing the contents of the kunigamae (固) component.
8 and 10. (not present in Unicode) – A portion at the top consisting of two or more consecutive characters is changed to a  shape. The  top radical has also been used (although rarely). A colloquial simplification for  exists (not present in Unicode) in which the right portion is replaced by Katakana  (ki) to indicate the on reading.
9. This character has also been seen in print.
The complicated character  (tō) is replaced by a simpler character of the same On reading, .
12. (present in Unicode as 𠯮 U+20BEE) – Also commonly seen.
13. ,  (not present in Unicode) – A colloquial simplification in which Katakana  (ma) is used to indicate the on reading of both characters (ma).

Further examples 

If the resulting character is a standard character with the same reading (common if keeping the phonetic), this is properly kakikae instead, but if it is simply a graphic simplification (with a different reading) or the resulting character is not standard, this is ryakuji. Often the result would be ambiguous in isolation, but is understandable from context. This is particularly common in familiar compounds, such as in the following examples:
  in 
  in 
  in 

In some cases, a component has been simplified when part of other characters, but has not been simplified in isolation, or has been simplified in some characters but not others. In that case, simplifying it in isolation can be used as common ryakuji.

More unusual examples come from calligraphic abbreviations, or more formally from printed forms of calligraphic forms: a standard character is first written in a calligraphic (grass script) form, then this is converted back to print script in a simplified form.

Derived characters
Derived characters accordingly also have derived ryakuji, as in these characters derived from :

Similarly, the  simplification is often used in fish compounds, such as  sushi, particularly in signs.

Phonetic simplifications

This may also be done using Latin characters; for example, the character  (as used in  kenpō, "constitution") may be simplified to "": the radical  placed over the letter K; this is particularly common in law school. Similarly,  (Keiō) as in Keio University may be simplified to "": the letters K and O respectively placed inside the radical . In this case the pronunciation of "" (as an initialism) sounds like the actual name "Keiō", hence the use.

The character  has a number of ryakuji, as it is a commonly used character with many strokes (16 strokes); in addition to the above phono-semantic simplification, it also has a number of purely graphical simplifications:

See also
 , small ke, simplification of 
 Kana ligature
 Shinjitai
 Simplified Chinese character
 Variant Chinese character
 Yakja, Korean simplifications

References

 Spahn and Hadamitzky, The Kanji Dictionary,

External links

 More examples of Ryakuji
 Even more examples of Ryakuji 

Kanji
Japanese writing system terms
Japanese writing system